A cyclocomputer, cycle computer, cycling computer or cyclometer is a device mounted on a bicycle that calculates and displays trip information, similar to the instruments in the dashboard of a car. The computer with display, or head unit, usually is attached to the handlebar for easy viewing. Some GPS watches can also be used as display.

History
In 1895, Curtis H. Veeder invented the Cyclometer. The Cyclometer was a simple mechanical device that counted the number of rotations of a bicycle wheel.   A cable transmitted the number of rotations of the wheel to an analog odometer visible to the rider, which converted the wheel rotations into the number of miles traveled according to a predetermined formula.  After founding the Veeder Manufacturing Company, Veeder promoted the Cyclometer with the slogan, It's Nice to Know How Far You Go.  The Cyclometer's success led to many other competing types of mechanical computing devices.  Eventually, cyclometers were developed that could measure speed as well as distance traveled.

Basic operation

The head
A basic cyclocomputer with a wheel speed sensor may display the current speed, average speed, maximum speed, trip distance, trip time, total distance traveled, and the current time. More advanced models with additional sensors and storage may display and record altitude, incline (inclinometer), heart rate, power output (measured in watt) and temperature as well as offer additional functions such as pedaling cadence, a stopwatch and even GPS navigation and video data overlay synchronization. They have become useful accessories in bicycling as a sport and as a recreational activity.

The display is usually implemented with a liquid crystal display, and it may show one or more values at once. Many current models display one value, such as current speed, with large numbers, and another number that the user may select, such as time, distance, average speed, etc., with small numbers. 

The head usually has one or more buttons that the user can push to switch the value(s) displayed, reset values such as time and trip distance, calibrate the unit, and on some units, turn on a back light for the display. Most displays are navigated by pressing buttons and high-end models use a capacitive touch screen to navigate screens and maps.

The wheel sensor
The older, traditional sensors have a magnet attached to a spoke of either the front or rear wheel. A sensor based either on the Hall effect, or on a magnetic reed switch, is attached to the fork or the rear of the frame. The sensor detects when the magnet passes once per rotation of the wheel and time stamps or time codes the revolution count. Alternatively, a sensor may be attached to the wheel hub. Distance is determined by counting the number of rotations, which translates into the number of wheel circumferences passed. Speed is calculated from distance against lapsed time period using the circumference of the wheel and the time it took to make one rotation.

The cadence sensor
To measure cadence (revolutions per minute of the crankarm), a magnet is mounted to the crankarm, and a sensor mounted to the frame. This works on the same principle as the speedometer function and measures the turning of the cranks and front chain ring.

Transmission
Some models use a wired connection between the sensor and the head unit. Other cyclocomputers, e.g. those used by competitive cyclists, transmit the data wirelessly from the sensor/transmitter to the head unit. Data can be exported to a SD card, computer, or phone and uploaded to an internet web service. Wireless cadence and speed sensors use wireless communication standards ANT + and Bluetooth Low Energy and can directly communicate with a smartphone application that also uses the phone's GPS, barometer, temperature, clock, and other sensors to create a more detailed picture, record, or map.

Calibration

Once a new computer is installed, it usually requires proper configuration. This normally includes selecting distance units (kilometers vs. miles) and the circumference of the wheel. Since the sensor measures wheel rotation, different wheel sizes will translate to different measures of speed and distance for a given number of rotations.

For more accuracy the bicycle (with the set cyclocomputer) must be ridden by the intended rider over an accurately measured distance. The computer's reading is then compared with the known distance and any necessary corrections made.

Additional information

Besides variables calculated from the rotating wheels or crank, cyclocomputers can display other information.

Gear
For integrated shifters on racing bicycles, the gear can be read by the computer: Shimano's Flight Deck and Campagnolo's ErgoBrain work with their respective systems to detect the gearing. This allows indirect measurement of cadence. These systems do not have sensors on the crankset or cassette to determine what gear the bicycle is in. They work exclusively with the shifters, which may result in misleading information. Instead of knowing what gear the bicycle is in, they rely on sensing when the cyclist changes gears using sensors in the shifters. If the gear change doesn't actually happen, or the computer's sensors are too sensitive (e.g.: when braking with STI-style shifters), the information displayed is not accurate.

Performance
With additional sensors, other performance measurements are available:
 A heart rate monitor can be integrated into the computer, using a chest strap sensor.
 A power meter measures power output in watts, using a torque sensor in the bottom bracket, pedals, or rear hub.

Environment
Some models also have sensors built into the head that measure and display environmental parameters such as temperature and altitude.

Cyclist power measurement

Some more sophisticated models are able to measure the rider's power in terms of watts. These units incorporate elements that measure torque at the crank, or rear wheel hub, or tension on the chain. This technology began in the late 1980s. (See Team Strawberry for the early development and testing stages of this technology.)

Maps
Some cyclocomputers (such as the Garmin Edge, trimm One, Wahoo Elemnt Bolt or Hammerhead Karoo) can be loaded with maps and can thus show the rider's position on the map, or provide turn-by-turn directions for a pre-determined route.

Electric bicycles
Most electric bicycles have a microcontroller in the motor controller to calculate input cadence or torque, adjust amperage, control the motors and send the display screen information. Often cyclists can select the level of power assist provided using the computer. The computer also monitors the speed and can deactivate the motor for braking or if required by law (for example, in many countries pedelec bikes cannot use motor assist above 25 km/h).

See also
 Outline of cycling

References

American inventions
Computer